Nubieber (formerly, Big Valley City and New Town) is a census-designated place in Lassen County, California. Its population is 19 as of the 2020 census, down from 50 from the 2010 census.

The settlement was established in 1931, when the railroads were built to the place. The first post office opened the same year. The name was a version of "New Bieber".  The first person born in the settlement was Shirley Patrica Warren, daughter of Rex and Beulah Warren.

Geography
According to the United States Census Bureau, the CDP has a total area of 0.8 square mile (2.0 km), of which over 99% is land.

Demographics
The 2010 United States Census reported that Nubieber had a population of 50. The racial makeup of Nubieber was 26 (52.0%) White, 0 (0.0%) African American, 13 (26.0%) Native American, 0 (0.0%) Asian, 0 (0.0%) Pacific Islander, 6 (12.0%) from other races, and 5 (10.0%) from two or more races. Hispanic or Latino of any race were 10 persons (20.0%).

The Census reported that 50 people (100% of the population) lived in households, 0 (0%) lived in non-institutionalized group quarters, and 0 (0%) were institutionalized.

There were 18 households, out of which 7 (38.9%) had children under the age of 18 living in them, 8 (44.4%) were opposite-sex married couples living together, 2 (11.1%) had a female householder with no husband present, 2 (11.1%) had a male householder with no wife present.  There were 2 (11.1%) unmarried opposite-sex partnerships, and 0 (0%) same-sex married couples or partnerships. 5 households (27.8%) were made up of individuals, and 1 (5.6%) had someone living alone who was 65 years of age or older. The average household size was 2.78.  There were 12 families (66.7% of all households); the average family size was 3.33.

The population was spread out, with 12 people (24.0%) under the age of 18, 5 people (10.0%) aged 18 to 24, 13 people (26.0%) aged 25 to 44, 16 people (32.0%) aged 45 to 64, and 4 people (8.0%) who were 65 years of age or older.  The median age was 35.0 years. For every 100 females, there were 163.2 males.  For every 100 females age 18 and over, there were 137.5 males.

The homeowner vacancy rate was 0%; the rental vacancy rate was 11.1%.  27 people (54.0% of the population) lived in owner-occupied housing units and 23 people (46.0%) lived in rental housing units.

Politics

References

Census-designated places in Lassen County, California
Populated places established in 1931
Census-designated places in California